The Hugh John Flemming Bridge is part of Route 130 located near the town of Hartland in Carleton County, New Brunswick, Canada.

See also 
 List of bridges in Canada

References

External links
Images

Road bridges in New Brunswick
Bridges completed in 1960
Buildings and structures in Carleton County, New Brunswick
Transport in Carleton County, New Brunswick
Tourist attractions in Carleton County, New Brunswick
1962 establishments in New Brunswick
Former segments of the Trans-Canada Highway